Adrien Trebel (born 3 March 1991) is a French professional footballer who plays as a midfielder for Anderlecht.

Club career
Trebel is a youth exponent from Nantes. He made his Ligue 2 debut at 10 February 2011 against Vannes OC replacing Ismaël Keïta after 72 minutes in a 1–0 away defeat. In 2014, he joined Belgian Pro League side Standard Liège. In January 2017, he joined Anderlecht.

On 31 January 2022, Trebel was loaned to Lausanne-Sport in Switzerland.

International career
Trebel was a youth international for the France U20.

Career statistics

Club

Honours

Club

Standard Liège 

 Belgian Cup: 2015-16

RSC Anderlecht 
 Belgian First Division: 2016-17
 Belgian Super Cup: 2017

Individual 

RSC Anderlecht Player of the Season: 2017-18

References

External links

1991 births
Living people
Sportspeople from Dreux
French footballers
France youth international footballers
Association football midfielders
FC Nantes players
Standard Liège players
R.S.C. Anderlecht players
FC Lausanne-Sport players
Ligue 1 players
Ligue 2 players
Belgian Pro League players
Swiss Super League players
French expatriate footballers
Expatriate footballers in Belgium
French expatriate sportspeople in Belgium
Expatriate footballers in Switzerland
French expatriate sportspeople in Switzerland
Footballers from Centre-Val de Loire